WMJL (1500 AM) is a radio station licensed to Marion, Kentucky, United States.  The station is  owned by Sun Media.

References

External links

MJL
Radio stations established in 1968
1968 establishments in Kentucky
MJL